These are the official results of the Men's 4.000m Team Pursuit at the 1976 Summer Olympics in Montreal, Quebec, Canada, held on 23 and 24 July 1976. There were 64 participant from 16 nations. In the first round each team raced alone, with the first eight teams qualifying for the quarterfinals.

Competition format

The team pursuit competition consisted of a qualifying round and a 3-round knockout tournament, including a bronze medal race. Each race, in both the qualifying round and the knock-out rounds, consisted of two teams of 4 cyclists each starting from opposite sides of the track. The teams raced for 4,000 metres, attempting to finish with the fastest time (measured by the third rider) and, if possible, catch the other team. For the qualifying round, the eight fastest times overall (regardless of whether the team finished first or second in its heat, though any team that was overtaken was eliminated) earned advancement to the knockout rounds. In the knockout rounds, the winner of each heat advanced to the next round. Teams could change members between rounds.

Results

Qualifying round

Quarterfinals

Quarterfinal 1

Quarterfinal 2

Quarterfinal 3

Quarterfinal 4

Semifinals

Semifinal 1

Semifinal 2

Finals

Bronze medal match

Final

Final classification

References

External links
 Official Report

P
Cycling at the Summer Olympics – Men's team pursuit
Track cycling at the 1976 Summer Olympics